Algonquin State Forest is a Connecticut state forest located in the towns of Colebrook and Winchester. The forest is managed for wildlife habitat and passive recreational activities. It contains two areas of special ecological importance: Sandy Brook Natural Area Preserve and Kitchel Wilderness Natural Area Preserve, the later donated by Helen Binney Kitchel in 1961, both protected as Forever Wild by state statute. The forest offers opportunities for hiking, wildlife viewing, and letterboxing.

References

External links
Algonquin State Forest Connecticut Department of Energy and Environmental Protection

Connecticut state forests
Parks in Litchfield County, Connecticut
Colebrook, Connecticut
Winchester, Connecticut
Protected areas established in 1937